Ibrahim Town is a locality within the city of Multan in the province of Punjab in the Islamic Republic of Pakistan.

It is located maximum within 5 minutes drive to Multan Cantt and 7 minutes to Multan International Airport.

The locality includes a total of 200 plots; a home of approx 1500 people. The locality includes 2 Mosques, 1 Government school (Noble Public School provides free education to 1000 children of the area around) and a Hospital.

The locality is based on 8 paved streets.

References

Multan Development Authority
Multan International Airport

Populated places in Multan District